L. N. Morris was an American football coach.  He was the fifth head football coach at Lehigh University in Bethlehem, Pennsylvania. He held that position for the 1896 season, compiling a record of 2–5.

Head coaching record

References

Year of birth missing
Year of death missing
Lehigh Mountain Hawks football coaches
Yale University alumni